Wilhelm Straßburger (12 July 1907 – 21 December 1991), nicknamed Willi or Willy, was a German footballer who played as a defender and made two appearances for the Germany national team.

Career
Straßburger made his international debut for Germany on 7 September 1930 in a friendly match against Denmark, which finished as a 3–6 loss in Copenhagen. He earned his second and final cap on 2 November 1930 in a friendly against Norway, which finished as a 1–1 draw in Breslau.

Personal life
Straßburger died on 21 December 1991 at the age of 84.

Career statistics

International

References

External links
 
 
 
 
 

1907 births
1991 deaths
Footballers from Duisburg
German footballers
Germany international footballers
Association football defenders